Altenkirchen-Flammersfeld is a Verbandsgemeinde ("collective municipality") in the district of Altenkirchen, Rhineland-Palatinate, Germany. The seat of the Verbandsgemeinde is in Altenkirchen. It was formed on 1 January 2020 by the merger of the former Verbandsgemeinden Altenkirchen and Flammersfeld.

The Verbandsgemeinde Altenkirchen-Flammersfeld consists of the following Ortsgemeinden ("local municipalities"):

 Almersbach 
 Altenkirchen
 Bachenberg 
 Berod bei Hachenburg 
 Berzhausen 
 Birnbach 
 Bürdenbach 
 Burglahr 
 Busenhausen 
 Eichelhardt 
 Eichen 
 Ersfeld 
 Eulenberg 
 Fiersbach 
 Flammersfeld
 Fluterschen 
 Forstmehren 
 Gieleroth 
 Giershausen 
 Güllesheim 
 Hasselbach 
 Helmenzen 
 Helmeroth 
 Hemmelzen 
 Heupelzen 
 Hilgenroth 
 Hirz-Maulsbach 
 Horhausen
 Idelberg 
 Ingelbach 
 Isert 
 Kescheid 
 Kettenhausen 
 Kircheib 
 Kraam
 Krunkel 
 Mammelzen 
 Mehren 
 Michelbach 
 Neitersen 
 Niedersteinebach 
 Obererbach 
 Oberirsen 
 Oberlahr 
 Obersteinebach 
 Oberwambach 
 Ölsen 
 Orfgen 
 Peterslahr
 Pleckhausen 
 Racksen 
 Reiferscheid 
 Rettersen 
 Rott 
 Schöneberg 
 Schürdt 
 Seelbach 
 Seifen 
 Sörth 
 Stürzelbach 
 Volkerzen 
 Walterschen 
 Werkhausen 
 Weyerbusch 
 Willroth 
 Wölmersen 
 Ziegenhain

External links
Official website

Verbandsgemeinde in Rhineland-Palatinate